Zadonsky (masculine), Zadonskaya (feminine), or Zadonskoye (neuter) may refer to:

Zadonsky District, a district of Lipetsk Oblast, Russia
Zadonsky (rural locality) (Zadonskaya, Zadonskoye), name of several rural localities in Russia

See also
Zadonsk